Adnan Hikmat oglu Hajizada (born 13 July 1983) is an Azerbaijani blogger and one of the founders of OL! Azerbaijani Youth Movement. He was employed as an internal communications officer at British Petroleum.

Early life and education

Hajizada was born in Baku. He graduated from Baku European Lyceum, participated in the Future Leaders Exchange (FLEX) program, and studied for a time at Baku's Qafqaz University. He holds a BA in Political Science from the University of Richmond and a law degree from Khazar University. He also has a masters in public administration from Columbia University.

Detention and jail sentence
On 8 July 2009, Hajizada and another Azerbaijani youth activist and blogger Emin Milli were assaulted and severely beaten by two men in a restaurant in downtown Baku. Milli and Hajizada went to file a complaint about the assault, but instead police detained them and opened a criminal case against both, who are charged with hooliganism.

On 10 July 2009, Judge Rauf Ahmadov of the Sabail district court in Baku placed both of them in pretrial detention for two months. Günter Nooke, German Federal Commissioner for Human Rights who was present in Baku during their trial but had to wait before the court and eventually, was the only one allowed to see Emin Milli for a few minutes. Subsequently, higher court rejected their appeal.

Reporters Without Borders, Organization for Security and Co-operation in Europe and European Union, as well as a number of foreign countries have strongly condemned Milli and Hajizada's arrest, while the case prompted protests from 18 officials of the University of Richmond, where Adnan studied and from BP, who employs him.

Investigation in Milli and Hajizada's case was concluded on 22 August and an additional charge was brought against them ("deliberately inflicting minor bodily harm"). On 4 September, Judge Araz Huseynov presided over the preparatory session where a variety of defense motions, including one to have the charges dropped, another to permit media coverage of the proceedings and a motion to set the defendants free on bail for the duration of their trial were denied. The first hearing of the case was set on 16 September.

Despite domestic and international pressure, on 11 November, the court sentenced Adnan Hajizada to two years in prison and Emin Milli - to two years and six months. Many rights groups, as well as US condemned the sentence.

In September 2010, U.S. President Barack Obama called for the men's release during a meeting with President Ilham Aliyev. A month later, the court in Azerbaijan has ordered the release of both jailed bloggers.

See also
 Emin Milli

References

External links
 Adnan Hajizada's bio - azeri version - www.adam.az
 Adnan Hajizada's bio
 Emin Milli and Adnan Hajizada at police station
 Blog for video petitions asking Emin and Adnan's release
 The Collegian - University of Richmond's full coverage of the case
 Protest Rally Was Held in Washington, DC in Support of Adnan Hajizada and Emin Milli
 Adnan Hajizada's Q&A on Reddit

1983 births
Living people
Azerbaijani democracy activists
Amnesty International prisoners of conscience held by Azerbaijan
Azerbaijani prisoners and detainees
Khazar University alumni
University of Richmond alumni
Azerbaijani activists
Azerbaijani bloggers
BP people